Power-to-X (also P2X and P2Y) is a number of electricity conversion, energy storage, and reconversion pathways that use surplus electric power, typically during periods where fluctuating renewable energy generation exceeds load.  Power-to-X conversion technologies allow for the decoupling of power from the electricity sector for use in other sectors (such as transport or chemicals), possibly using power that has been provided by additional investments in generation.  The term is widely used in Germany and may have originated there.

The X in the terminology can refer to one of the following: power-to-ammonia, power-to-chemicals, power-to-fuel, power-to-gas (power-to-hydrogen, power-to-methane) power-to-liquid (synthetic fuel), power to food, power-to-syngas and power-to-power. Electric vehicle charging, space heating and cooling, and water heating can be shifted in time to match generation, forms of demand response that can be called power-to-mobility and power-to-heat.

Collectively power-to-X schemes which use surplus power fall under the heading of flexibility measures and are particularly useful in energy systems with high shares of renewable generation and/or with strong decarbonization targets.  A large number of pathways and technologies are encompassed by the term. In 2016 the German government funded a €30million first-phase research project into power-to-X options.

Electricity storage concepts 
Surplus electric power can be converted to other forms of energy for storage and reconversion.  Direct current electrolysis of water (efficiency 80–85% at best) can be used to produce hydrogen which can, in turn, be converted to methane (CH4) via methanation. Another possibility is converting the hydrogen, along with CO2 to methanol. Both these fuels can be stored and used to produce electricity again, hours to months later.  Reconversion technologies include gas turbines, CCGT plant, reciprocating engines and fuel cells.  Power-to-power refers to the round-trip reconversion efficiency. For hydrogen storage, the round-trip efficiency remains limited at 35–50%.  Electrolysis is expensive and power-to-gas processes need substantial full-load hours (say 30%) to be economic. 
However, while round-trip conversion efficiency of power-to-power is lower than with batteries and electrolysis can be expensive, storage of the fuels themselves is quite inexpensive. This means that large amounts of energy can be stored for long periods of time with power-to-power, which is ideal for seasonal storage. This could be particularly useful for systems with high variable renewable energy penetration, since many areas have significant seasonal variability of solar, wind, and run-of-the-river-hydroelectric generation. Grid-dedicated battery storage is not normally considered a power-to-X concept.

Sector coupling concepts 

Hydrogen and methane can also be used as downstream fuels, fed into the natural gas grid, or used to make synthetic fuel.  Alternatively they can be used as a chemical feedstock, as can ammonia.

Power-to-heat involves contributing to the heat sector, either by resistance heating or via a heat pump.  Resistance heaters have unity efficiency, and the corresponding coefficient of performance (COP) of heat pumps is 2–5.  Back-up immersion heating of both domestic hot water and district heating offers a cheap way of using surplus renewable energy and will often displace carbon-intensive fossil fuels for the task. Large-scale heat pumps in district heating systems with thermal energy storage are an especially attractive option for power-to-heat: they offer exceptionally high efficiency for balancing excess wind and solar power, and they can be profitable investments.

Power-to-mobility refers to the charging of battery electric vehicles (EV).  Given the expected uptake of EVs, dedicated dispatch will be required. As vehicles are idle for most of the time, shifting the charging time can offer considerable flexibility: the charging window is a relatively long 8–12hours, whereas the charging duration is around 90minutes. The EV batteries can also be discharged to the grid to make them work as electricity storage devices, but this causes additional wear to the battery.

Heat pumps with hot water storage and electric vehicles have been found to have higher potential on reduction of  emissions and fossil fuel use than several other power-to-X or electricity storage schemes for using surplus wind and solar power. However, while power-to-heat and power-to-mobility through electrification (heat pumps and electric vehicles) have a high emissions reduction potential, if the goal is a 100% clean system, there are some end uses which cannot be economically electrified. These end uses include long-distance shipping (trucking, airplanes, barges) and high heat industrial processes. In these cases, using fuels synthesized from clean electricity might be the best option. Biofuels are another option, but they compete with agriculture for water and space.

According to the German concept of sector coupling interconnecting all the energy-using sectors will require the digitalisation and automation of numerous processes to synchronise supply and demand.

See also 
 Energy storage
 Grid energy storage
 Power-to-gas
 Power-to-heat
 Electrofuel

References 

Energy policy
Energy policy of Germany
Energy storage
Power engineering